Greenwich Township is one of the nineteen townships of Huron County, Ohio, United States. As of the 2010 census the population of the township was 1,044, up from 954 at the 2000 census.

Geography
Located on the southern edge of the county, it borders the following townships:
Fitchville Township - north
New London Township - northeast corner
Ruggles Township, Ashland County - east
Butler Township, Richland County - southeast
Blooming Grove Township, Richland County - southwest
Ripley Township - west
Fairfield Township - northwest corner

The village of Greenwich, a separate municipality, is located in western Greenwich Township.

Name and history
Greenwich Township was named after Greenwich, Connecticut, the hometown of many of its pioneer settlers.

It is the only Greenwich Township statewide.

Government
The township is governed by a three-member board of trustees, who are elected in November of odd-numbered years to a four-year term beginning on the following January 1. Two are elected in the year after the presidential election and one is elected in the year before it. There is also an elected township fiscal officer, who serves a four-year term beginning on April 1 of the year after the election, which is held in November of the year before the presidential election. Vacancies in the fiscal officership or on the board of trustees are filled by the remaining trustees.

References

External links
County website

Townships in Huron County, Ohio
Townships in Ohio